Kristóf Papp (born 14 May 1993 in Kerepestarcsa) is a Hungarian football player who currently plays for Paksi FC.

Career

Paks
On 8 August 2015, Papp played his first match for Paks in a 3-1 win against Budapest Honvéd in the Hungarian League.

Career statistics

Club

References

External links

1993 births
Living people
Hungarian footballers
Association football midfielders
Vác FC players
Gyirmót FC Győr players
Paksi FC players
Nemzeti Bajnokság I players